The European Conference on Information Systems (ECIS) is an annual conference for information systems and information technology academics and professionals and was affiliated with the Association for Information Systems (AIS). The organization of the conference comes under the purview of the ECIS Standing Committee. After being an affiliated AIS conference for many years, ECIS now has officially been adopted as the World Region 2 (Europe, Africa and Middle East) conference for AIS since 2017.

ECIS is considered to be one of the premier information systems event in the European region  and provides a platform for panel discussions and the presentation of peer-reviewed information systems research papers. The conference more recently had acceptance rates in the low 30% range. The electronic version of the conference proceedings (1993-2008-excluding 1995 and 1998) and full citations (1993-2008) are available publicly.

The first ECIS conference took place in 1993 in Henley-on-Thames, United Kingdom.

See also
Management information system

References

External links

Academic conferences
Information systems conferences
Information technology organizations based in Europe
Association for Information Systems conferences